HMS L8 was a L-class submarine built for the Royal Navy during World War I. The boat survived the war and was sold for scrap in 1930.

Design and description
The L-class boats were enlarged and improved versions of the preceding E class. They displaced  on the surface and  submerged. The L-class submarines had a crew of 35 officers and ratings.

For surface running, the boats were powered by two 12-cylinder Vickers  diesel engines, each driving one propeller shaft. When submerged each propeller was driven by a  electric motor. They could reach  on the surface and  underwater.

The boats were armed with a total of six 18-inch (45 cm) torpedo tubes. Four of these were in the bow and the remaining pair in broadside mounts. They carried 10 reload torpedoes, all for the bow tubes. They were also armed with a  deck gun.

Construction and career
HMS L8 was built by Cammell Laird, Birkenhead. She was laid down on 28 May 1916 and was commissioned on 12 March 1918. She was based at Falmouth, Cornwall in 1918. She was then assigned in the Reserve Flotilla in Hong Kong. She was sold on 7 October 1930 to John Cashmore Ltd for scrapping at Newport, Monmouthshire.

Notes

References
 
 
 
 

 

British L-class submarines
Ships built on the River Mersey
1917 ships
World War I submarines of the United Kingdom
Royal Navy ship names